Spantax Flight 275, registration number EC-BZR, was a Convair 990 Coronado charter flight operated by Spantax from Tenerife to Munich with 148 passengers and 7 crew. On December 3, 1972, the plane crashed while taking off from Tenerife-Norte Los Rodeos Airport in Tenerife, killing everyone aboard. Many of the passengers were West German tourists heading home.

Accident
The flight took off at 06:45am in almost zero visibility and crashed shortly after,  beyond the runway. The crew's loss of situational awareness in the low-visibility conditions was also a factor. All 155 people aboard were killed.

At the time, the accident was the deadliest aircraft crash on the island of Tenerife, to be surpassed by the Tenerife airport disaster five years later. It was the eighth loss and deadliest accident involving a Convair 990 Coronado.

Aircraft
The accident aircraft had been in service since 1962. The airplane was destroyed in the crash and was written off.

See also

 Dan-Air Flight 1008
 List of accidents and incidents involving commercial aircraft
 Tenerife airport disaster

References 

Convair aircraft
Aviation accidents and incidents in 1972
Aviation accidents and incidents in Spain
Accidents and incidents involving the Convair 990 Coronado
1972 in Spain
275
December 1972 events in Europe